The Chetwode Islands are a group of islands near the Marlborough Sounds along the northern coast of the South Island of New Zealand.

The remaining islets are tiny in comparison. All  of the Chetwode Islands are a nature reserve.

See also

 Islands of New Zealand
 List of islands
 Desert island

References

External links 
 Nukuwaiata / Inner Chetwode Island – 1936 and 2011 – In the footsteps of Edgar Stead
 Nukuwaiata (Inner Chetwode Island) birds and lizards

Uninhabited islands of New Zealand
Islands of the Marlborough Sounds